Vettius Agorius Basilius Mavortius ( 527–534) was a Roman aristocrat who lived during Ostrogothic rule. He was appointed consul for 527.

Biography 

Mavortius was probably the son of Caecina Mavortius Basilius Decius, consul in 486, and related to Vettius Agorius Praetextatus, an influential aristocrat of the late 4th century. In 527, Mavortius held the positions of Comes domesticorum (Commander of the Imperial Guard) and consul.

Subscriptions in three manuscripts containing the works of Horace state that Mavortius emended one text of that poet in the sixth century. The scholar Vollmer believed Mavortius' copy was the archetype of the entire tradition, but R. J. Tarrant argues that the subscription was copied from Mavortius' manuscript into an unrelated book, then found its way into the three surviving manuscripts – which otherwise belong to different branches of the manuscript transmission. A subscription with Mavortius' name also appears in a sixth-century manuscript of Prudentius.

Notes

Further reading 
 MacGill, Scott, Virgil Recomposed: The Mythological and Secular Centos in Antiquity,  Oxford University Press, 2005, pp.72-73.
 John Robert Martindale, "Vettius Agorius Basilius Mavortius", in Prosopography of the Later Roman Empire, Volume 2, Cambridge University Press, Cambridge 1980, pp. 736–737.

6th-century Italo-Roman people
6th-century Roman consuls
Comites domesticorum
Imperial Roman consuls
Vettii